Peter Tilbury (born 20 October 1945) is a British actor and writer, best known for the sitcom It Takes a Worried Man (1981-4), which he created and starred in.

Tilbury was born in Redruth, Cornwall. As an actor Tilbury's television appearances include The Shadow of the Tower (1972), Dixon of Dock Green (1974), Miss Marple (1987), Fortunes of War (1987)  Casualty (1989), The Bill (1990), Birds of a Feather (1990), and Chef! (1993).

He appeared in the film Breaking Glass (1980). The following year, in It Takes a Worried Man, he created the character of Philip Roath, who was approaching a mid-life crisis. Other major characters in the series were played by Nicholas Le Prevost, as his psychiatrist, Christopher Benjamin, as his boss, and Sue Holderness, as his girlfriend.

As a television writer Tilbury's credits include Sorry, I'm A Stranger Here Myself, the first three series of Shelley, starring Hywel Bennett, and nine episodes of Chef! from 1993 to 1994, starring Lenny Henry, for which Tilbury was nominated for a BAFTA in 1994. He also wrote ten episodes of Birds of a Feather from 1990 to 1996, and three episodes of Not Going Out in 2007. His play Under the Doctor, starring Peter Davison and Anton Rodgers, opened at the Comedy Theatre in London in 2001. It received poor reviews and soon closed.

References

External links
Peter Tilbury at IMDb
Peter Tilbury at British Comedy Guide

1945 births
Living people
People from Redruth
English male television actors
English television writers
English male writers
British male television writers